Circus is a block breaker arcade game released by Exidy in 1977, and distributed by Taito in Japan. The game is a re-themed variant of Atari's Breakout, where the player controls a seesaw and clown in order to pop all the balloons in the level. The game has been copied and released under different names by numerous other companies in both the United States and Japan.

Gameplay
Three rows of triangular balloons move along the top part of the screen, each overlaid with blue, green, and yellow (colors used in the original version), counting from the top row. A clown appears from the edge of the screen where there is a jumping board, and the player must move the springboard located at the bottom of the screen so that the clown can bounce back off the seesaw once he jumps off from his starting position. However, it is impossible to make contact with the clown with the seesaw in certain locations. The four jumping boards located on the sides of the screen serve to decrease the area where it is impossible to make contact.

If the player successfully gets the clown onto the seesaw, the clown on the other side shoots off into the air towards the three rows of balloons on the top of the screen. The clown may not have enough speed to reach the balloons if the first clown does not land squarely on the seesaw. Clowns bounce off of balloons, walls, and jumping boards, but will pass directly through multiple balloons if they are moving quickly enough. They will only bounce off the jumping boards when they are heading downwards and will pass straight through the boards while moving upwards.

Hitting any of the balloons with the clown causes them to burst, and the player receives 20 points for bursting the yellow balloon, 50 points for the green balloon, and 100 points for the blue balloon. Bursting the entire row of balloons causes a sound effect and awards the player 10 times the original points as a bonus (i.e. 200 points for the yellow balloon). A new row of balloons instantly replaces the old one when the entire row is destroyed.

Destroying all of the blue balloons causes another sound effect and allows the player to play one more time (one clown) after they have depleted their stock. The words "BONUS PLAY" appear to indicate this bonus, but destroying all of the blue balloons a second time will not allow the player to gain another clown (the bonus can be activated while the player is using the extra clown). This may differ in certain levels like 7 and 8, where all three rows of balloons must be destroyed in order to activate the bonus.

A clown will die if the player fails to receive them with the seesaw at the bottom of the screen, and two measures of the funeral march in Frédéric Chopin's Piano Sonata No. 2 are played as a sound effect. The player can continue if they still have stock remaining, or if they have been rewarded the bonus play. When the player has depleted all of their stock, the screen switches over to the demo screen, where the number of balloons is the same as that of the player's before they lost their final clown. If the player has reached over a certain number of points, they can play one more time like the balloon bonus (the availability of this bonus may differ, as indicated in the list of rules shown after the player enters the credits). The player cannot gain another clown in the same way during this play bonus.

Reception
The arcade game was a commercial success for Taito in Japan, where Circus was among the top ten highest-earning arcade games of 1977 and the year's fourth highest-earning arcade video game, below Taito's own Speed Race DX, Atari's Breakout (distributed by Namco) and Universal's Scratch.

Computer and Video Games magazine reviewed the Atari VCS version in 1989, giving it an 82% score.

Reviews
Games

Legacy

Arcade clones
Clowns (licensed release by Midway)
Acrobat (licensed release by Taito). It was the seventh highest-earning arcade video game of 1978 in Japan.
Circus Circus (Universal)
Seesaw Jump (Sega)
Devil Circus (Hoei)
Pierrot (Uko)
Piccolo (IPM)
Fūsen-wari game (lit. "Balloon popping game" Data East)
Bonpa (Nihon Bussan)
Balloon Circus (Data East). The screen is changed to a vertical rectangle. A cabinet version titled Mini Balloon was also released by Data East.
Nyankoro (IPM). The balloons are changed to kittens, and the mother cat appears to prevent the player from progressing after a certain amount of time passes.

Home clones

 Atari released Circus Atari for the Atari VCS on January 10, 1980.
 Datasoft's 1982 Clowns and Balloons, for the Atari 8-bit family, replaces the seesaw with a trampoline.
 Seesaw Jump 2005 was released for the i-mode network by Sega.
Circus Linux, an open source reimplementation developed by New Breed Software, available for various platforms

Similar games
Trapeze (Exidy). The character gathers stars by swinging off the trapeze. The same game was also released by Taito with the title Trampoline.
Gypsy Juggler (Meadows Games). This game uses otedama as a motif, and was also released by Taito.
Rip Cord (Exidy). This game uses sky diving as a motif, and has sound effects for the start of the game and game over scene (The U.S. Air Force (song) for the opening and Ring a Ring o' Roses for game overs.) It was released in Japan by Data East as Nice On.
Field Goal (Taito). This game uses American football as a motif. Though the game uses a normal paddle instead of a seesaw, the game is similar to Circus in that the objective is to eliminate 3 rows of football players wearing uniforms of different colors. Eliminated rows are refilled along with a similar sound effect to the original game.
Plump Pop (Taito). This game was released as a remake of Circus in 1987. It was later ported to PlayStation 2. The seesaw was changed to a trampoline and features cuter characters, new items, levels, and bosses.

Appearances in other media
In the animated movie version of Ace o Nerae!, the main character, Hiromi Oka, plays arcade games at gamecenters and cafes in several scenes, and the sound effect for when an entire row of balloons is destroyed is used as part of the background music.
Japanese electropop band Yellow Magic Orchestra included a track titled "COMPUTER GAME 'Theme From the Circus'" in their first album, where they include some of the sound effects from the game. The sounds were created in semblance of the arcade music using a synthesizer rather than recording directly into the track. Video footage of the game appeared in the music video for Tong Poo.
One of Akira Toriyama's early works, Wonder Island 2, includes a scene where Circus is parodied. This scene is also included in Akira Toriyama's Manga Theater Vol.1.

See also

List of Atari 2600 games

References

External links
Circus at Arcade-history
Circus at the Killer List of Video Games

1977 video games
Arcade video games
Breakout clones
Exidy games
Video games about clowns
Video games developed in the United States